Arsène Alexandre (16 August 1859, Paris – 1 October 1937, Brain sur Allonnes) was a French art critic.

He was a contributor to L'Événement, Le Paris and L'Éclair and in 1894 was one of the founders of the satirical journal Le Rire, becoming its artistic director. He was later art critic for Le Figaro. Alexandre and Félix Fénéon were the first to use the term 'pointillism', in 1886, and Alexandre alone coined the term 'the Rouen School', in 1902 in a catalogue to an exhibition of the work of Joseph Delattre at the galerie Durand-Ruel à Paris. He also wrote several articles for Le Théâtre, notably 'Le Théâtre au Salon' in June 1898 and several theatre reviews.

He was Inspecteur Général des Musées during the First World War.

Works

 Honoré Daumier, l'homme et l'œuvre, H. Laurens, Paris, 1888
 Oeuvre d'Alphonse de Neuville, A. Lahure, 1889
 A. L. Barye, Librairie de l'Art, 1889
 Histoire de l'art décoratif du XVIe siècle à nos jours, H. Laurens, 1892
 L'Art du rire et de la caricature, Librairie-imprimerie réuies, 1892
 La Sœur de Pierrot, novel, illustrations de A. Willette, Librairie Delagrave, 1893
 Histoire populaire de la peinture, H. Laurens, 1895
 Jean Carriès, imagier et potier: étude d'une œuvre et d'une vie, Librairies-imprimeries réunies, Paris, 1895
 Le Balzac de Rodin, H. Floury Éditeur, Paris, 1898
 A. F. Cals ou le bonheur de peindre, G. Petit, 1900
 Les Reines de l'aiguille: modistes et couturières, étude parisienne, T. Belin, 1902
 Ignacio Zuloaga, Manzi-Joyant, 1903
 La maison de Victor Hugo. Editions Hachette, 1903
 Auguste Rodin, Manzi-Joyant, 1904
 Donatello, H. Laurens, Paris, 1904
 Jean-François Raffaelli, peintre, graveur et sculpteur, H. Floury, Paris, 1909
 La Collection Henri Rouart, Goupil & Cie, Imprimeurs-éditeurs. Limited edition, 1912
 L'Art décoratif de Léon Bakst, M. de Brunoff, Paris, 1913
 Vladimir de Terlikowski Peintre, éditions Alcan, Paris, 1927
 Louise C. Breslau, Rieder, Paris, 1928
 Botticelli, Rieder, Paris, 1929
 Frank Boggs, Le Goupy, Paris, 1929
 Paul Gauguin : sa vie et le sens de son œuvre, Bernheim-Jeune, Paris, 1930
 Emile Friant et son oeuvre, Etablissement Braun & Cie, Mulhouse-Dornach (Haut-Rhin), no date (1931?), 48 p., 62 pl.
 Vermeer et l'école de Delft, 1933
 La Vie et l'Œuvre de Charles Pinet, graveur (1867–1932), Protat frères, Mâcon, 1934
 Les Années de captivité de Beethoven (1819–1827), F. Alcan, Paris, 1936

Notes

External links
Signac, 1863-1935, a fully digitized exhibition catalog from The Metropolitan Museum of Art Libraries, which contains material on Alexandre (see index)

1859 births
1937 deaths
French art critics
Writers from Paris
French journalists
French male non-fiction writers